The Avro 549 Aldershot was a British single-engined heavy bomber aircraft built by Avro.

Development and design
The Aldershot was designed to meet the 1920 British Specification 2/20 for a heavy long-range day and night bomber to be powered by a Rolls-Royce Condor engine. The specification required a range of 500 miles (800 km) and a bombload of 2,000 lb (900 kg), originally comprising a single World War I vintage 1,800 lb (820 kg) SN bomb, but then changed to four 500 lb (230 kg) bombs carried externally or eight 250 lb (114 kg) bombs internally. The Air Ministry gave Avro a contract for two prototypes, designated Aldershot I, on 2 December 1920, in competition with the de Havilland Derby.

The first prototype flew at Hamble Aerodrome near Southampton in October 1921. As a result of test flying, the fuselage was lengthened by 6 ft (2 m) in order to improve directional control, being displayed in this form at the RAF Display at Hendon on 24 June, the second prototype flying in July with the lengthened fuselage and a modified undercarriage.

The first prototype was modified as a testbed for the water-cooled Napier Cub engine, in this form becoming the Aldershot II, flying on 15 December 1922. It was later used to test the slow-revving 850 hp (630 kW) Beardmore Typhoon I inline engine, flying in this form on 10 January 1927.

The Aldershot was a three-bay biplane, with a steel-framed fuselage structure with plywood and fabric covering, and wooden wings. The pilot and navigator were seated side by side in a cockpit behind the upper wing trailing edge, with additional accommodation for the navigator who was also the bomb-aimer, in a cabin inside the fuselage, which was provided with four circular windows on each side. A gunner sat in a separate cockpit behind the pilot, and was armed with a Lewis gun on a Scarff ring. Another Lewis gun could be fitted to a ventral mounting in the cabin, while there was provision for a fixed, forward-firing Vickers machine gun operated by the pilot, although this was rarely fitted. A bomb bay forward of the cabin could hold eight 250 lb (114 kg) bombs, with larger bombs being carried externally under the fuselage.

The Aldershot also formed the basis for the Avro Andover transport, which used the same wings, tail and powerplant but had a new fuselage.

Operational history
When it was evaluated against the de Havilland Derby, the Aldershot proved to be the superior aircraft, with the mixed-construction Aldershot being about 800 lb (360 kg) lighter than the all-wooden Derby, which had no provision for carrying its bombload internally, or for any ventral armament.

On 26 January 1923, the Air Ministry ordered 15 aircraft under the designation Aldershot III. The only operator of the aircraft was No. 99 Squadron RAF which reformed on 1 April 1924, receiving its Aldershots from July that year. The Aldershot was mainly used for night flying, but occasionally flew day bombing exercises. Unlike the other members of the RAF's heavy bomber force, it was operated in an all-silver colour scheme, rather than the dark-green NIVO scheme usually used for night operations. By 1925, the Air Ministry had decided that heavy bombers should have multiple engines, and 99 Squadron started to receive the twin-engined Handley Page Hyderabad in January 1926, with the Aldershots being completely replaced in Squadron service by March that year.

Variants
Avro 549 Aldershot I
Prototype. Two built.
Avro 549A Aldershot II
First prototype modified with 1,000 hp (746 kW) Napier Cub engine.
Avro 549B Aldershot III
Production version. 15 built. One modified with metal wings as Avro 549M.
Avro 549C Aldershot IV
First prototype modified with Beardmore Typhoon engine.

Operators

 Royal Air Force
 No. 99 Squadron RAF

Specifications (Aldershot III)

See also

Notes

References

External links

 Avro Aldershot – British Aircraft Directory

1920s British bomber aircraft
549
Single-engined tractor aircraft
Biplanes
Aircraft first flown in 1921